The ICF Canoe Slalom World Cup is an annual series of races in canoe slalom held under the auspices of the International Canoe Federation. It has been held since 1988 in four canoe and kayak disciplines for men and women. The four original disciplines were men's single canoe (C1), men's double canoe (C2), men's kayak (K1) and women's kayak. A women's single canoe discipline (C1) has been added to the world cup in 2010. The men's C2 event was removed from the world cup series in 2018 and it was replaced by the mixed C2 event. 2018 was also the first time that world cup points were awarded for the extreme K1 event.

Competition format
The world cup is a series of individual races usually taking place during the summer months of June, July and August. The athlete (or boat) that accumulates the highest number of points from all world cup races in the given discipline becomes the overall world cup champion. The scoring system as well as the number of world cup races have changed multiple times over the years. Currently the winner of a world cup race gets 60 points (120 points in the World Cup Final). The points for lower positions vary by discipline.

World Cup Champions

Canoe

Kayak

Most successful countries

Most successful athletes

Venues 
46 unique venues have held a Canoe Slalom World Cup between 1989 and 2019. This includes those that have held the World Championships or Continental Championships which counted towards world cup points (2005-2010 and 2018). As of 2008, a world cup has been held in every inhabitable continent.

See also 
Canoe slalom
ICF Canoe Slalom World Championships
Canoeing at the Summer Olympics
Canoe World Cup
ICF Canoe Slalom World Rankings

References 
 World Cup winners

External links 
 International Canoe Federation

 
Canoeing and kayaking competitions
Canoeing
Recurring sporting events established in 1988
Canoe slalom